Open Rev. is a web-based platform for open discussion and annotation of research publications and related material. 

Researchers can comment directly on text, formulas, and images in research papers, post related questions and answer questions posed by each other. Open Rev's web-based PDF viewer allows public discussion and open peer review of scientific publications. User contributions are licensed under Creative Commons Attribution-ShareAlike 3.0 Unported.

Open Rev. was a participant of the Harvard i-Lab Venture Incubation Program 2014 and has won awards from the Harvard Institute for Learning and Teaching and Education Innovation Pitch Competition.

History 
Open Rev. was created by Erik Bauch and Georg Kucsko, PhD candidates in the Harvard Physics program. It officially launched in 2014. As of 2015, the user base had risen to over 1000 participants and included institutions such as Harvard, MIT, Northeastern University, Royal Holloway University of London, and Uppsala Universitet.

Media 
Open Rev. has been featured in Harvard Physics, the Harvard Gazette and the Harvard alumni magazine, Colloquy. In an interview in Colloquy, co- Bauch explained, “Up until now scientific discussions usually occurred at conferences, in journal club, or in hallways on the way to lunch. With Open Rev. we are trying to motivate people to take some of these discussions online and share their knowledge with the whole scientific community.”

Features 
 public commenting and Q&A on PDF papers
 private groups with tagging and discussions
 public groups to share papers by topic
 web-based PDF viewer with PDF search capability
 rate papers, comments and replies
 Latex and Markdown support
 picture upload
 anonymous commenting
 automatic extraction of metadata from PDFs
 tagging of PDFs
 import papers from arXiv

References 

Reference management software
Science websites
Scholarly communication